Abbeys and priories in Hampshire lists abbeys, priories, friaries or other monastic religious houses in Hampshire, England.

Overview
Hampshire, and especially the city of Winchester had many important and influential monasteries, especially those Benedictine houses of royal foundation such as the Priory of St Swithun and Newminster. The county was also rich in alien priories, probably because the county was readily accessible  from the continent and Normandy. The Cistercians considered the New Forest remote enough for a foundation at Beaulieu and its daughter house at Netley. In addition, all four orders of the mendicant friars established houses in Winchester, one of only a handful of cities where all four orders were present. There were six houses of Austin Canons but only one of Premonstratensian Canons. The Carthusians and Gilbertines had no presence in the county. The Knights Templar owned property but had no establishments, and the Knights Hospitaller had only one preceptory at North Baddesley.

There were hospitals for the accommodation and relief of poor wayfarers, the sick and infirm at Winchester, Southampton, Portsmouth, Basingstoke and Fordingbridge. And colleges at Marwell, Winchester and Basingstoke.

The main table includes abbeys, priories and friaries, including alien houses, monastic granges, cells, and camerae of the military orders of monks (Templars and Hospitallers).  Hospitals and colleges are listed separately.

Locations

Map key

Winchester
  Austin Friary
  Dominican Friary
  Carmelite Friary
  Franciscan Friary
  Winchester Cathedral Priory
  Hyde Abbey
  St Mary's Abbey

Southampton
  Franciscan Friary
  Southampton Priory

Abbeys, Priories and Friaries

Description of table
Foundations are listed alphabetically.

Communities/provenance: shows the status and communities existing at each establishment, together with such dates as have been established as well as the fate of the establishment after dissolution, and the current status of the site.

Alt. Name: some of the establishments have had alternative names over the course of time.  In order to assist in text-searching such alternatives in name or spelling have been provided.

Formal Name/dedication: shows the formal name of the establishment or the person in whose name the church is dedicated, where known.

References: presents links to online references to the particular establishment in addition to the general printed and online references given at the foot of this article.  Establishments for which online references have not been specified are referred to within the printed references listed.

Location: provides a link to the geographical position of the site of the foundation where established.  Where the location has been established the location is pinpointed (dependent on the available resolution of the map data), otherwise the general location is given in italic.

Abbreviations and key

Hospitals
 Hospital of St Cross, near Winchester
 Hospital of St Mary Magdalen, Winchester
 Hospital of St John the Baptist, Winchester
 Hospital of St Julian, or God's House, Southampton
 Hospital of St Mary Magdalen, Southampton
 Hospital of God's House, Portsmouth
 Hospital of St John the Baptist, Basingstoke
 Fordingbridge Hospital

Colleges and collegiate churches
 Marwell College
 College of St Elizabeth, Winchester
 Chapel and Guild of the Holy Ghost, Basingstoke

Notes

References

A History of the County of Hampshire: Volume 2, The Victoria County History 1973